Blue Cow is a ski resort that is part of Perisher located in the Snowy Mountains of New South Wales, Australia, within the Snowy Monaro Regional Council. The resort is situated within the Kosciuszko National Park and is administered by the NSW National Parks & Wildlife Service. During winter months, the only access to the village is via the Skitube underground railway. In summer, access is via off-road only. Blue Cow is one of the four resort bases within Perisher, Australia's largest ski resort.

Also known as the Blue Cow Mountain, Mount Blue Cow or The Blue Cow, the mountain lies within the Main Range of Snowy Mountains, part of the Great Dividing Range.

Skiing

The last establishment of a major skifield in New South Wales came with the development of Mount Blue Cow in the 1980s. In 1987 the Skitube Alpine Railway opened to deliver skiers from Bullocks Flat, on the Alpine Way, to Perisher Valley and to Blue Cow, which also opened in 1987. The operators of Blue Cow purchased Guthega in 1991, and the new combined resort later merged with Perisher-Smiggins to become the largest ski resort in the Southern Hemisphere. In 2022 Perisher had 48 lifts covering  and four village base areas: Perisher Valley, Blue Cow, Smiggin Holes and Guthega.

Blue Cow has eight ski lifts:
 Ridge Quad Chair
 Summit Quad Chair
 Early Starter Double Chair
 Terminal Quad Chair
 Brumby T-Bar
 Pony Ride Carpet
 Snowsports School Rope Tow (Snowsports School only)
 Pleasant Valley Quad Chair

See also

 Skiing in Australia
 Skiing in New South Wales
 List of mountains in New South Wales

References

External links
  Perisher Home Page

Ski areas and resorts in New South Wales
Mountains of New South Wales
1987 establishments in Australia
Snowy Monaro Regional Council